Presque Isle International Airport , formally Northern Maine Regional Airport at Presque Isle, is a mile northwest of Presque Isle, in Aroostook County, Maine, United States. It serves the residents of Presque Isle and a vast area of northern Maine and northwestern New Brunswick. Airline flights to Newark Liberty International Airport are subsidized by the federal government's Essential Air Service program at a cost of $3,892,174 (per year).

Federal Aviation Administration records say the airport had 13,385 passenger boardings (enplanements) in calendar year 2008, 13,513 in 2009 and 15,052 in 2010. The National Plan of Integrated Airport Systems for 2011–2015 categorized it as a primary commercial service airport (more than 10,000 enplanements per year).

The airport has the third longest active runway in Maine at 7439' (behind Bangor International Airport, 11,440' and Brunswick Executive Airport, formerly Naval Air Station Brunswick runway 1R/19L, 8000'), and fifth longest overall (after the Loring Commerce Centre, formerly Loring Air Force Base (runway closed), 12,100', and Brunswick Executive Airport 1L/19R (runway closed), 8000'). It was once hub to Aroostook Airways, a commuter airline in the 1970s, with service to several cities throughout New England.

History

World War II
During World War II the federal government appropriated the airport, establishing an air base for planes bound to and from Great Britain. Lane Construction of Hampden was one of the contractors who worked on upgrading the airport for the military. Almost overnight, Presque Isle Army Airfield became a vital air transport installation and the city found itself a busy war center. During the Second World War, Clark Gable was briefly stationed at Presque Isle before being sent to England. Operations during this period were described by Ernest K. Gann, based on his personal experiences in the Air Transport Command, in his book, Fate Is the Hunter.

Post war
When the United States Air Force closed Presque Isle Air Force Base in 1961, the former Air Force Base was redeveloped. Presque Isle is home the University of Maine at Presque Isle, as well as the Northern Maine Community College. Scheduled commercial air service is available through Northern Maine Regional Airport in Presque Isle. General aviation services are available through both Northern Maine Regional Airport and Caribou Municipal Airport.

In addition, the Skyway Industrial Park sits adjacent to Northern Maine Regional Airport which offers commercial airline as well as general aviation services to the entire region. FedEx and United Parcel Service augment park accessibility by air to and from major markets.

Skyway Industrial Park, owned by the city of Presque Isle and administered by the Presque Isle Industrial Council, has been attractive to a variety of new businesses. To date, over 40 companies have located on the park. Located adjacent to the airport and within  of downtown, the park has become a dominant feature in the local and regional economy.

Facilities
The airport covers 1,489 acres (603 ha) at an elevation of 534 feet (163 m). It has two asphalt runways: 1/19 is 7,439 by 150 feet (2,267 x 46 m) and 10/28 is 5,994 by 100 feet (1,827 x 30 m).

In the year ending July 31, 2015 the airport had 5,750 aircraft operations, an average of 16 per day: 30% general aviation, 31% airline, 38% air taxi, and 1% military. In June 2018, there were 24 aircraft based at the airport: 20 single-engine, 4 multi-engine, and 1 jet.

Aircraft servicing Presque Isle include Cessna 208 Caravans and Beechcraft C99s operated by Wiggins Airways. Passenger service is offered with CommutAir, which operates Bombardier CRJ550 aircraft for United Express.

Airline and destination

Passenger

Cargo

Statistics

Carrier shares

Top destinations

Accidents and incidents
 March 1, 1998: Two pilots performing practice instrument landing system (ILS) approaches at night in a Piper PA-31, aircraft registration N777HM, died when the aircraft crashed into rising terrain  from the airport. The National Transportation Safety Board (NTSB) attributed the accident to the pilot's failure to follow correct instrument approach procedures; contributing factors were fog, low ceilings, and darkness.
 April 10, 1998: A Ted Smith Aerostar 600A, registration N7527S, rolled into a near-vertical dive immediately after takeoff; the pilot, who was the sole aircraft occupant, was killed in the crash and ensuing fire. The NTSB was unable to determine why the pilot apparently lost control of the aircraft.
 November 22, 2017: The left-hand engine of a Cessna 421, registration N421RX, caught fire soon after takeoff from Presque Isle; the pilot attempted to return to the airport but was unable to maintain altitude and performed a forced landing in an adjacent field. Two persons aboard the aircraft suffered minor injuries and two others were uninjured; the aircraft was badly damaged. The NTSB attributed the accident to a fuel leak onto the hot turbocharger.
 March 4, 2019: CommutAir Flight 4933, operating for United Express, arrived from Newark Liberty International Airport and missed runway 1 on landing, injuring five people and severely damaging the aircraft. The NTSB attributed the accident to confirmation bias which prompted the pilots to continue descending even though they could not see the runway in heavy snow. Contributing factors were poor decision-making by the captain; fatigue of the first officer, who was flying the aircraft; and misalignment of the ILS localizer caused by deep snow, a condition that multiple pilots had noticed previously but which had not been properly reported. Contrary to initial statements by CommutAir and the Federal Aviation Administration, the aircraft did not slide off the runway, but instead missed the runway entirely.

References

Other sources

 Essential Air Service documents (Docket DOT-OST-2000-8012) from the U.S. Department of Transportation:
 Order 2004-10-16 (October 25, 2004): re-selecting Colgan Air, Inc., to provide subsidized Essential Air Service (EAS) at Presque Isle/Houlton, Augusta/Waterville, Bar Harbor and Rockland, Maine, for a two-year period at a combined annual subsidy rate of $4,312,849.
 Order 2006-8-24 (August 25, 2006): re-selecting Colgan Air, Inc., operating as US Airways Express, to provide subsidized essential air service (EAS) at Presque Isle/Houlton, Augusta/Waterville, Bar Harbor, and Rockland, Maine, at a total annual subsidy rate of $4,774,068 ($3,572,592 for Augusta/Waterville, Bar Harbor, and Rockland; $1,201,476 for Presque Isle/Houlton), for the two-year period of November 1, 2006, through October 31, 2008.
 Order 2008-5-23 (May 19, 2008): re-selecting Colgan Air, Inc., operating as US Airways Express, to provide subsidized essential air service (EAS) at Presque Isle/Houlton, Maine, at an annual subsidy rate of $2,643,588, for the two-year period of May 15, 2008, through May 31, 2010.
 Order 2010-6-5 (June 2, 2010): selecting Colgan Air Inc., operating as US Airways Express, to provide essential air service (EAS) at Presque Isle, Maine, for an annual subsidy of $2,812,853 for the two-year period from June 1, 2010 to May 31, 2012.
 Order 2012-3-2 (March 2, 2012): selecting PenAir to provide EAS at Presque Isle and Plattsburgh using 34-passenger Saab 340 aircraft. At Presque Isle, PenAir will provide 19 weekly round trips for an annual subsidy rate of $4,341,967 for the first 6 months after full EAS commences and an annual subsidy rate of $3,892,174 for the 18 months thereafter.

External links
 , official site
 Aerial image as of May 1996 from USGS The National Map
 

Airports in Aroostook County, Maine
Essential Air Service
Buildings and structures in Presque Isle, Maine